Silviu Cătălin Iorgulescu (born 28 July 1946) is a Romanian former footballer who played as a goalkeeper.

International career
Silviu Iorgulescu played four games at international level for Romania, including one appearance in a 3–1 victory against Greece at the Balkan Cup. He also played once for Romania's Olympic team in a 2–1 victory against Denmark at the 1976 Summer Olympics qualifiers.

Notes

References

External links

Silviu Iorgulescu at labtof.ro

1946 births
Living people
Romanian footballers
Romania international footballers
Association football goalkeepers
Liga I players
Liga II players
ASC Oțelul Galați players
Faur București players
FC Argeș Pitești players
FC UTA Arad players
FCM Bacău players
Romanian football managers
Békéscsaba 1912 Előre managers
Nemzeti Bajnokság I managers
Romanian expatriate football managers
Expatriate football managers in Hungary